Swinging Like Tate is an album by saxophonist Buddy Tate which was recorded in 1958 and released on the Felsted label.

Reception

Scott Yanow of AllMusic states, "The music overall is fine mainstream jazz of the 1950s that is easily recommended to straightahead jazz fans although little unexpected or all that memorable occurs".

Track listing
 "Bottle It" (Skip Hall) – 6:00
 "Walk That Walk" (Dickie Wells) – 8:32
 "Miss Sadie Brown" (Eli Robinson) – 5:57
 "Moon Eyes" (Buddy Tate) – 7:38
 "Rockin Steve" (Buck Clayton) – 7:00
 "Rompin with Buck" (Tate) – 5:22

Personnel
Buddy Tate – tenor saxophone, clarinet
Buck Clayton (tracks 4-6), Pat Jenkins (tracks 1-3) – trumpet
Dicky Wells (tracks 4-6), Eli Robinson (tracks 1-3) – trombone
Ben Richardson – alto saxophone, clarinet (tracks 1-3)
Earle Warren – alto saxophone, baritone saxophone (tracks 4-6)
Skip Hall – piano
Everett Barksdale (tracks 1-3), Chauncey "Lord" Westbrook (tracks 4-6) – guitar
Aaron Bell (tracks 4-6), Joe Benjamin (tracks 1-3) – bass
Jo Jones (tracks 4-6), Herbie Lovelle (tracks 1-3) – drums

References

Buddy Tate albums
1958 albums
Felsted Records albums